"Do It to It" is the lead single from American girl group Cherish's 2006 debut album, Unappreciated. "Do It to It" features rap/hip hop artist Sean P. The song peaked at number 12 on the Billboard Hot 100 during its 16th week on the chart. It also reached number 15 on the Billboard Hot Digital Songs chart and number 8 on the Hot 100 Airplay chart. It had strong video play on BET and reached number 2 on 106 & Park. The song played for the limit of 65 days on the countdown and was eventually retired. It was the only video to be retired that year that did not reach number one.

Music
The song moves at a tempo of 74 beats per minute in the key of G harmonic minor, and follows the chord progression of G–Cm–Cm–G.

Commercial performance
"Do It to It" debuted at number 86 on US Billboard Hot 100 for the week of May 20, 2006. It peaked at number 12 for the week of September 2, 2006. It stayed on the chart for twenty-one weeks.

Music video
The video begins with the girls' father forbidding them to party, have boys over, or stay up late while their parents are out of town. After he leaves, Farrah turns to the camera and says: "Y'all know it's on, right?". The girls then begin a dance routine in front of a silver background spliced with a wild party being hosted at their house. The next day, the parents return to find the party mess and a boy wandering around the house, leaving the girls sighing at being caught.

The video was shot in Atlanta, Georgia and was directed by Benny Boom. J-Nicks, Jazze Pha, & D-Roc of the Ying Yang Twins made cameo appearances.

MTV censored the word "kryptonite" from its airings of the video, as in the United States, that word is slang for marijuana.

Remixes
A remix of the song (Rap Remix) exists, featuring artists Yung Joc, Jody Breeze, Chingy and Fabo. This version also references some songs by artists, like Yung Joc's "It's Goin' Down" and Fabo from D4L's "Laffy Taffy".

Track listings
UK CD single
 "Do It to It" (main radio version)
 "He Said She Said" 

European CD single
 "Do It to It" (main radio version)
 "That Boi"
 "Ghetto Mentality"

iTunes EP
 "Do It to It" (main radio version) – 3:44
 "Do It to It" (instrumental) – 3:43
 "Do It to It" (a cappella) – 3:39

iTunes single
 "Do It to It" (main radio version) – 3:44
 "Do It to It" (edited rap remix)  – 4:10

Charts

Weekly charts

Year-end charts

Release history

Acraze featuring Cherish version
 
A tech house rework by Orlando-based DJ and producer Acraze (Charlie Duncker), credited to "Acraze featuring Cherish", was released on August 20, 2021. In the United States, it reached number three on the Billboard Hot Dance/Electronic Songs chart, and in Australia, it reached number 13 on the ARIA Club Tracks chart. On November 12, the track (as issued by Thrive Music) entered the top 40 of the UK Singles Chart for the first time, arriving at number 36 (up from number 60). On the Official Charts of January 7, 2022, "Do It to It" reached to UK Top 10 for the first time when it climbed up from number 43 to number 9 in its tenth week on the chart and reached the Irish Top 3. After dropping as low as number 68 on the UK singles chart, the song re-entered UK Top 40 (on the chart week-ending March 10, 2022) after the release of the official video.

Track listing
Digital download and streaming
 "Do It to It" – 2:37

Digital download and streaming – Tiësto remix
 "Do It to It" (Tiësto remix) – 2:05
 "Do It to It" – 2:37

Digital download and streaming – Andrew Rayel remix
 "Do It to It" (Andrew Rayel remix) – 2:26
 "Do It to It" – 2:37

Digital download and streaming – Sub Focus remix
 "Do It to It" (Sub Focus remix) – 3:14
 "Do It to It" – 2:37

Digital download and streaming – Subtronics remix
 "Do It to It" (Subtronics remix) – 2:27
 "Do It to It" – 2:37

Digital download and streaming – Remixes
 "Do It to It" (Tiësto remix) – 2:05
 "Do It to It" (Subtronics remix) – 2:27
 "Do It to It" (Andrew Rayel remix) – 2:26
 "Do It to It" (Sub Focus remix) – 3:14
 "Do It to It" (Rated R remix) – 2:12
 "Do It to It" – 2:37

Charts

Weekly charts

Year-end charts

Certifications

Squid Game mashup
Zedd created a mashup of this version mixed with the soundtrack to Squid Game which he played at EDC 2021 and subsequently released to streaming platforms.

References

2006 singles
2006 songs
2021 singles
Capitol Records singles
Cherish (group) songs
Crunk songs
Music videos directed by Benny Boom
Number-one singles in Hungary
Southern hip hop songs